The 2016–17 Bowling Green Falcons men's basketball team represented Bowling Green State University during the 2016–17 NCAA Division I men's basketball season. The Falcons, led by second-year head coach Michael Huger, played their home games at the Stroh Center as members of the East Division of the Mid-American Conference.

They finished the season 13–19, 7–11 in MAC play to finish in a tie for eighth place. As the No. 10 seed in the MAC tournament, they lost in the first round to Toledo.

Previous season
The Falcons finished the 2015–16 season 16–18, 5–13 in MAC play to finish in last place in the East Division. They defeated Kent State and Central Michigan to advance to the semifinals of the MAC tournament where they lost to Akron.

Departures

Incoming Transfers

Recruiting class of 2016

Recruiting class of 2017

Roster

Schedule and results

|-
!colspan=9 style=| Exhibition

|-
!colspan=9 style=| Non-conference regular season

|-
!colspan=9 style=| MAC regular season

|-
!colspan=9 style=| MAC tournament

See also
 2016–17 Bowling Green Falcons women's basketball team

References

Bowling Green
Bowling Green Falcons men's basketball seasons